Emin can be a surname of Arabic (Amin) origin.

Notable people with the surname include:

 Mihail Eminovici (1850–1889), Romanian poet, philosopher, journalist and political activist. Considered to be one of the most salient figures in Romanian history.
 Joseph Emin (1726–1809), Armenian nationalist
 John Emin (born 1951), Australian rules footballer
 Tracey Emin (born 1963), British artist
 Viktor Car Emin (1870–1963), Croatian writer
 Fedor Emin (1735–1770) Russian poet and novelist (original name Mahomet-Ali Emin)
 Ibrahim Emin (1963-2019), Soviet and Azerbaijani musician (original name Ibrahim Eminov)

See also 
 Emin (given name)
 Emin (disambiguation)

Turkish-language surnames